Moià (Spanish: Moyá) is a municipality in the comarca of Moianès, Catalonia, Spain. Since May 2015 it has been the capital of the new comarca of Moianès; previously it was in Bages.

References

External links
 Government data pages 

Municipalities in Moianès